Absalom Themba Dlamini (born 1 December 1950) was the Prime Minister of Eswatini from November 2003 to September 2008. He is the managing director of Tibiyo Taka Ngwane.

Biography 

Dlamini graduated from the University of Botswana and Swaziland in 1978 with a bachelor's degree. In 1987, he earned a master's degree from the University of Nairobi. He gained experience in many different fields since his apprenticeship; he held manager positions with the Eswatini National Provident Fund, the Central Bank of Eswatini and the Eswatini Industrial Development Company. In addition, Dlamini served as a director in many Swazi companies. From 1991 he was the director and chairman of Tibiyo TakaNgwane, a national organization for the preservation of the culture of Eswatini and the development of economic strategies.

Dlamini was appointed Prime Minister on 14 November 2003. King Mswati III honored him with the "Royal Medal of the Supreme Advisor to the Royal Decree of King Sobhuza II." He remained in office until 18 September 2008 when Bheki Dlamini was appointed acting Prime Minister. On 16 October 2008, he was succeeded by former Prime Minister Barnabas Sibusiso Dlamini.

References

External links 
A.T also got award from Rudy King Sibongule Sukati, Times of Swaziland October 13, 2010, Retrieved 27 October 2010

1950 births
Living people
Prime Ministers of Eswatini
University of Botswana and Swaziland alumni
University of Nairobi alumni